Hanking Center is a skyscraper in Shenzhen, Guangdong, China. Construction started in 2013 and was completed in 2018.

See also

List of tallest buildings in Shenzhen
List of tallest buildings in China
List of tallest buildings in the world

References

Buildings and structures under construction in China
Skyscraper office buildings in Shenzhen